Baba Yaga (released August 20, 2002 by the label Grappa Music – GMCD 4178) is a live album by Annbjørg Lien.

Track listing 
«The Rose» (5:11) (Traditional)
«Loki»  (Annbjørg Lien / Bjørn Ole Rasch (5:36)
«Origins: Tidr/Nordfjordhalling/Oainnahus/Homage/Phoenix» (14:35) (Annbjørg Lien / Bjørn Ole Rasch / traditional)
«The Water Lily» (5:13) (Gjermund Haugen)
«Morning Mood» (0:31) (Edvard Grieg)
«Knepphalling» (4:12) (Traditional)
«Larry Goes Log-Driving: Old Larry/The Log-Driver» (5:30) (Annbjørg Lien / Bjørn Ole Rasch)
«Luseblus» (5:02) (Annbjørg Lien)
«Astra» (5:12) (Annbjørg Lien / Bjørn Ole Rasch)
«Inoque» (4:40) (Annbjørg Lien / Bjørn Ole Rasch)
«Aliens Alive: Wackidoo/Crusade/The Wild Winter» (9:58) (Annbjørg Lien / Bjørn Ole Rasch / traditional)
«Fykerud's Farewell to America» (4:44) (Traditional)

Personnel 
Annbjørg Lien –  hardanger fiddle & nyckelharpa
Roger Tallroth – guitar
Rolf Kristensen – guitar & electric guitar
Bjørn Ole Rasch – Jew's-harp, keyboards & sampling
Hans Fredrik Jacobsen – flute, Jew's-harp & vocals
Rune Arnesen - drums & percussion
Per Hillestad - drums & percussion

Credits 
Annbjørg Lien - arranger, composer & concept
Morten Lund - mastering
Drew Miller - graphic remix
Helge Skodvin - cover photo
Roger Tallroth - arranger
Bjørn Ole Rasch - arranger, composer, concept & producer

References 

Annbjørg Lien albums
2002 live albums